V7AB (A.M. 1098 kHz) is a radio station at Majuro, Marshall Islands.  It operates at a power of 5,000 watts and airs a public/community format.

External links 
 Online Live Broadcasting

Communications in the Marshall Islands